Vesna Sekulić (born 1953), is a Serbian writer, poet and doctor. She finished elementary and high school in Belgrade and graduated at the University of Belgrade Faculty of Medicine. Vesna is a general practitioner, acupuncturist and nutritionist. She lives and works in Belgrade. Vesna has been writing poems and short stories since her school days.

Career
So far, she has published eight books of poems. One of them is a book of poems for children and two are books of short stories. Her poems and stories have been published in over thirty anthologies, both domestic and international. She received awards and praises for her work. She is a member of the Association of Writers of Serbia, U.P. "The Poet", U.K. "Zenit" from Podgorica and former president of the "Vidar" association of doctors and writers.

References

External links 
 Dr Vesna Sekulic - Udruzenje lekara pisaca Vidar (Tv Duga Plus 2017)
 Vesna Sekulic, Poems

Serbian children's writers
Serbian women poets
1953 births
Living people
20th-century Serbian poets
Serbian physicians
20th-century women physicians
University of Belgrade Faculty of Medicine alumni
Physicians from Belgrade
Writers from Belgrade
People from Topola